Belo is a small settlement in the Municipality of Medvode in the Upper Carniola region of Slovenia. In the past it was known as Nawelim in German.

Name
Belo was attested in historical documents as Weizzenperg in 1364, and as Wela, Nabela, and Vnnderwela in 1498, among other spellings.

Cultural heritage
Several structures in Belo are registered as cultural heritage:
The farm at Belo no. 1, known as the Lenart farm, consists of a single-story stone house with a 16th-century foundation; the year 1858 is carved into the door casing. There is a cottage bearing the year 1827; this was a building used by a retired farmer that continued to live on the farm. Other structures include a granary with a cellar, a stone barn with a mow, a beehouse, a fruit-drying shed, and a hayrack. There is also a plaque on the house commemorating the communist people's hero Lizika Jančar (a.k.a. Majda; 1919–1943), who was shot in Belo on 20 March 1943.
The house at Belo no. 2 stands on the eastern edge of the settlement, east of the farm at Belo no. 1. It is a two-story stone house from the end of the 20th century completely reconstructed from older architectural elements brought from elsewhere, including a door casing from green tuff, window casings, and beamed ceilings.

References

External links 

Belo on Geopedia

Populated places in the Municipality of Medvode